The Near Earth Network (NEN, formerly GN or Ground Network) provides orbital communications support for near-Earth orbiting customer platforms via various ground stations, operated by NASA and other space agencies. It uses a number of different dishes scattered around the globe. The antennas must be able to move fast for tracking of objects in low Earth orbit (LEO). The NEN and SN combined were previously referred to as the Spaceflight Tracking and Data Network (STDN).

Ground stations

NEN uses several stations run by NASA:

 Alaska Satellite Facility in Fairbanks, Alaska— Supports: S/X Band — Assets: 11.3m/11m/9.1m
 Kennedy Uplink Station,  Merritt Island Launch Annex (MILA)— Supports: S-band - Assets: 6.1m
 McMurdo, Antarctica— Supports: S/X Band — Assets: 10m
 Ponce de Leon Station, Florida — Supports: S-band - Assets: 6.1m

 Wallops Ground Station, in Wallops Island, Virginia— Supports: VHF, S/X Band — Assets: 11m/5m
 White Sands Ground Station, New Mexico — Supports: VHF, S/Ka Band — Assets: 18.3m
NEN uses Stations run by KSAT — Kongsberg Satellite Services:
 Singapore, Malaysia — Supports: S/X Band — Assets: 9.1m
 Svalbard Satellite Station Norway — Supports: S/X Band — Assets: 11.3m/11.3m/13m
 TrollSat, Antarctica — Supports: S/X Band — Assets: 7.3m/7.3m

NEN uses a Station run by SANSA — South African National Space Agency:
 Hartebeesthoek, South Africa — Supports: S/X Band — Assets: 12m/10m
 A new ground station is under construction in Matjiesfontein, scheduled to come online in 2025. 

NEN uses Stations run by SSC — Swedish Space Corporation

 Kiruna, Sweden — Supports: S/X Band — Assets: 13m/13m
 Santiago, Chile— Supports: S Band — Assets: 9m/12m/13m
 Space US North Pole, Alaska— Supports: S/X Band — Assets: 5m/7.3m/11m/13m
 SSC Space US Dongara, Australia — Supports: S/X Band — Assets: 13m
 Space US South Point, Hawaii — Supports: S/X Band — Assets: 13m/13m

Also under contract was Poker Flat Research Range. Additionally, the MILA and Wallops stations provide pre-launch, launch, and landing communications support for the Space Shuttle program.

Authority and responsibility
The NEN falls under NASA's SOMD (Space Operations Mission Directorate), interoperating with the SCaN Program offices. The Goddard Space Flight Center Ground Network Project has responsibility for maintaining the NEN, as well as implementing the Satellite laser ranging (SLR) Network.

Support for Constellation
The NEN was slated to support the Constellation Program, including the Ares launch vehicle, NISN (NASA Integrated Services Network), FDF (Flight Dynamics Facilities), KSC Launch Control Center, and the Constellation Mission Control Center (MCC). Constellation has since been canceled.

See also

 Deep Space Network (DSN)
 Eastern Range (ER)
 Indian Deep Space Network (IDSN)
 Space Communications and Navigation Program (SCaN)
 Space Network (SN)
 Tracking and Data Relay Satellite (TDRS)

References

Footnotes
 Constellation Architecture Requirements Document (CARD), CxP 70000, Revision C (December 25, 2008). NASA: Constellation Systems Engineering and Integration Office
 Space Network User's Guide (SNUG), 450-SNUG, Rev 9.

External links 
 NASA's Goddard Space Flight Center Near Earth Network Official Page

 

NASA radio communications and spacecraft tracking facilities
Goddard Space Flight Center